The Mixed team recurve open event is one of three team events to be held in Archery at the 2020 Summer Paralympics in Tokyo. It contained fourteen teams of one man and one woman.

Following a ranking round, twelve of the fourteen teams entered. the knockout rounds at the first round stages, with the top two progressing directly to the quarterfinals. The losing semifinalists play off for the bronze medal.

Ranking round
The ranking round was held on 27 August.

Elimination round

References

Team recurve open